Cazouls may refer to two communes in the Hérault department in southern France:
 Cazouls-d'Hérault
 Cazouls-lès-Béziers